Olena Cherevatova (born 17 July 1970) is a Ukrainian sprint canoer who competed in the 2000s. Competing in two Summer Olympics, she won a bronze medal in the K-4 500 m event at Athens in 2004.

Cherevatova also won a silver medal in the K-4 1000 m event at the 2003 ICF Canoe Sprint World Championships in Gainesville.

References
DatabaseOlympics.com profile

Sports-reference.com profile

1970 births
Canoeists at the 2000 Summer Olympics
Canoeists at the 2004 Summer Olympics
Living people
Olympic canoeists of Ukraine
Olympic bronze medalists for Ukraine
Ukrainian female canoeists
Olympic medalists in canoeing
ICF Canoe Sprint World Championships medalists in kayak
Medalists at the 2004 Summer Olympics
21st-century Ukrainian women